Andreína María Álvarez Medina Covian (born January 19, 1979, in Caracas, Venezuela) is a Venezuelan and Dominican actress, entertainer, comedian, singer and acting teacher.

Works

Acting 

 Radio Rochela
 Mujer con Pantalones - Linda Bombón (2004-2005)
 El gato tuerto - Ana Montes (2007-2008)
 Cheverísimo (2002-present)
 Tremenda Opción del Sábado "Dominican animated comedy program" (dubbing in the Dominican accent) (2000–present)
 ¡A que te ríes! (2010)
 El Show del Vacilón (2014)
 El Show de joselo (2000-2012)
 Sal y pimienta (2000-2008)

Productions 

 Ají Picante - Main host
 Bailando con los Abuelos - Co-host (2008)
 Súper sábado sensacional - Invited host (2008–Present)
 El Show del Vacilón - Co-host (2014)
 Buscando una estrella - Co-host (2014)
 TV Libre - Host (2016)

Theater 

 Se busca hombre
 Cata de Hombres
 Mujeres infieles
 Despedida de Casadas

Other 

 Bailando con los gorditos - Participant (2008)
 Buscando una estrella - Judge (2008, 2015), Participant (2013)
 El precipicio disparatado (2012-2013)
 Se Solicita Julieta (2018)

References 

Living people
1979 births
Venezuelan LGBT actors
Venezuelan stage actresses
21st-century Venezuelan women singers
Venezuelan rappers
Venezuelan television actresses
Venezuelan women comedians
21st-century Venezuelan actresses
21st-century comedians
Actresses from Caracas
21st-century Venezuelan LGBT people